The Dolly's Brae conflict occurred in County Down in Ulster on 12 July 1849. A contested procession by Orangemen resulted in a skirmish between the Orangemen, local Catholics and Ribbonmen and the police. The Catholics dispersed, following which the Orangemen proceeded to attack local Catholics and destroy property. An official report on the conflict stated that there were thirty deaths. However, this figure is contested by historians. The violence led directly to the Party Processions Act, curtailing activities perceived to be sectarian in Ireland. Nevertheless, the conflict entered Ulster Protestant folk memory as the Battle of Dolly's Brae.

Context
The 1840s were a significant decade in Irish history. The Great Famine began in 1845, resulting in around one million deaths. A nationalist rebellion by William Smith O'Brien's Young Ireland movement occurred in 1848.

Sectarian tensions rose during the decade. The Orange Order experienced a revival, having been suppressed in previous years and were once again allowed to hold processions, which they did. Catholic groups also held their own processions. Early in 1849 a riot broke out in Crossgar in County Down raising tensions before the traditional Orange marching season in July.

Sectarian tensions had been building up in South Down throughout the 1840s. In 1848 local magistrates had persuaded South Down Orangemen to re-route their annual 12 July march away from areas with a majority Catholic population. This included Dolly's Brae, which was known as the site of a sectarian murder of a Catholic at the beginning of the century. The Orangemen's compliance brought taunts of cowardice from Catholic Ribbonmen, who had even composed a song about the affair. The Orangemen were determined to march their traditional route the next year. It had become a point of honour for them.

12 July 1849
On the morning of the 12th the Orangemen set off on their march from Ballyward Church to Lord Roden's demesne at Tollymore Park (now Tollymore Forest Park). Lord Roden was serving as deputy grandmaster of the Orange Order at the time. Historian Sean Farrell estimates there were between 1,200 and 1,400 marchers. One magistrate estimated that about five hundred had guns.

A large group of Catholics from both the local area and beyond attempted to prevent the Orangemen marching through the Brae. Sources disagree over how many were present, though they seem to have been outnumbered. They had taken positions on a nearby field and were armed with scythes, pikes and firearms. However, the large police presence and the intervention of two Catholic priests seeking to prevent physical conflict meant that there was no attack.

At Lord Roden's estate, numerous speeches were given and alcohol was consumed. None of those present who were magistrates, including Lord Roden, attempted to convinced the Orangemen to return via a different route. In some cases, the opposite occurred. The Orangemen were once more determined to return via the Brae. They arrived there at about five o'clock, with a large Catholic crowd waiting for them. After two-thirds of the marchers had gone through the pass a gunshot or a similar sound was heard. Both sides fired at each other. The police charged the Catholics at the top of the hill, causing them to disperse. The skirmish was over in a matter of minutes.

Following the retreat the Orangemen proceeded to attack Catholics and their property in the vicinity. They may have caused several fatalities. None of the Orangemen were arrested over these actions.

Government estimates placed the number of dead Catholics at over thirty, with no casualties among the Orangemen and one injury on the police side. Larger numbers of dead have been given. However, at least one historian believes that the number of dead has been greatly exaggerated and did not exceed single figures.

Aftermath
The uproar over the conflict led directly to parliament passing the Party Processions Act of 1850, which prohibited open marching, organised parades and sectarian meetings.  Actions such as using banners, emblems and flags constituted an offence, as did music "calculated or tend to provoke animosity". Violation of the Act was classed as a misdemeanour. The act was reluctantly accepted by the Orangemen. However, Irish nationalists later felt restricted in their activities by it, and it was repealed in 1872.

As well as the act of parliament Roden and two other Orange magistrates were dismissed from the magistracy, following a report by Walter Berwick QC, which criticized their handling of the incident.

Despite these setbacks the 'Battle of Dolly's Brae' entered Ulster Protestant folklore. As Sean Farrell says, 'the Rathfriland Orangemen had won back their honour, but only at a very high price.' A song, still recorded to these day, was composed to commemorate what was considered to be a great victory against the Ribbonmen. Ulster Protestant soldiers serving in the British Army at the Somme are said to have shouted 'Remember Dolly's Brae' as they went into battle.

References

External links
 Modern recording of 'Dolly's Brae'
 RTE Radio 1 documentary on the conflict

1849 in Ireland
Battles involving Ireland
Conflicts in 1849
Orange Order
Sectarian violence